Funderburk (German: Vonderburg) or Funderburke is a surname, and may refer to:

David Funderburk (born 1944), American diplomat, politician, and writer
Laurie Funderburk (born 1975), American politician from the state of South Carolina
Lawrence Funderburke (born 1970), American professional basketball player
Brent Funderburk (born 1952, contemporary), American fine artist

References

German-language surnames
Surnames of German origin